Todd Woodbridge and Mark Woodforde were the two-time defending champions and won in the final 7–6, 7–6 against Mark Knowles and Daniel Nestor.

Seeds
All sixteen seeded teams received byes into the second round.

Draw

Finals

Top half

Section 1

Section 2

Bottom half

Section 3

Section 4

References
 1997 Lipton Championships Men's Doubles Draw

Men's Doubles
Doubles